In enzymology, a 2-dehydro-3-deoxy-D-gluconate 6-dehydrogenase is an enzyme that catalyzes the chemical reaction

2-dehydro-3-deoxy-D-gluconate + NADP+  (4S,5S)-4,5-dihydroxy-2,6-dioxohexanoate + NADPH + H+

Thus, the two substrates of this enzyme are 2-dehydro-3-deoxy-D-gluconate and NADP+, whereas its 3 products are (4S,5S)-4,5-dihydroxy-2,6-dioxohexanoate, NADPH, and H+.

This enzyme belongs to the family of oxidoreductases, specifically those acting on the CH-OH group of donor with NAD+ or NADP+ as acceptor. The systematic name of this enzyme class is 2-dehydro-3-deoxy-D-gluconate:NADP+ 6-oxidoreductase. Other names in common use include 2-keto-3-deoxy-D-gluconate dehydrogenase, and 2-keto-3-deoxygluconate dehydrogenase.

References 

 

EC 1.1.1
NADPH-dependent enzymes
Enzymes of known structure